is a Japanese four-panel manga series written and illustrated by Ruri Miyahara. An anime adaptation by Doga Kobo aired in Japan from July to September 2013.

Plot
Love Lab is set in Fujisaki Girls Academy, which is known for their school body being composed of very proper students. The most prominent one of them is Natsuo Maki, the student president who is admired by her classmates for her calm and polite demeanor. On the other hand, Riko Kurahashi is also admired but for having a very forward and boyish personality. Riko accidentally walks into Maki when she is kissing a body pillow with a picture of a guy for practice, and learns that she is not as collected as everyone thinks she is. Riko is forced into keeping Maki's secret and joins her in practicing romance activities such as holding hands and more.

Characters

Main characters

 is a popular girl who has a very forward and boyish personality. She joins the student council as an aide to president Maki after she is recruited for her perceived romance experience, even though she possesses little practical experience in love. However, even though she has a boyish personality, she secretly wishes that she could have a cuter nickname instead of "Wild Kid" and wants to have a cuter approach but has a trouble doing so due to how embarrassed she gets every time she tries to do something girlish. Riko can't stand  handsome gentlemen like guys. Later in the manga, she realizes that she has feelings for Nagi.

The student council president,  has a polite and calm demeanor. She is admired by the majority of students in their academy. Despite her reputation as a model student, in truth, Maki aims to learn about romance. Her devotion to this can lead to extremities to the point where she owns a hug pillow named , which she sometimes uses as practice for kissing. Another fact is that, despite her vast intelligence and rumored "perfection," whenever she is alone with Riko, she appears to have almost no common sense or perception of tact, almost to the point where one might think she's actually an airhead. Her lack of logic is especially prominent when it comes to the topic of romance that she loves so much; not only that, her perception of an ideal romance appears to mainly consist of common anime tropes, even down to having extremely melodramatic dialogue and bumping into someone while carrying bread in her mouth. Her father owns a famous undergarments manufacturer. She cross-dresses herself (Makio) sometimes to help Riko. She always finds herself having misunderstandings with Yan.

 is a petite and shy girl who serves as the student council's secretary. Inside their council office, she is usually in charge in making slapsticks that other members uses to punish fellow members as well. She has an older brother and sister who dote on her.

 is a rich girl with thick eyebrows; she serves as the student council vice-president. Formerly the Student Council President, she resigns due to Maki not relying on her but is later reinstated as vice-president. She and Sayori are close friends. Eno also has a brother who is rather unstable and proclaims himself as a masochist, much to Eno's dismay. Eno finds herself falling in love with Minami Middle School's president Toda Haruka.

 wears glasses and is the student council treasurer. Infamously known to be somewhat wicked and a miser, Sayo actually has a boyfriend who lives in the neighboring district. Due to her greed over the Student Council's budget, Sayo is fired from the council by Maki, but is later reinstated along with Eno.

Supporting characters
 

 is Riko's friend and classmate.

 

 is Riko's childhood friend and former football teammate. He had a very feminine appearance when he was younger, which caused Riko to not initially recognize him. During grade school he asked out Riko, but he was rejected, although Riko does not remember this event and Nagi hopes she never does. Nagi hates being called cute and whacks Riko on the head every time she calls him cute, likewise Riko does the same to him when he refers to her as a boy. In the manga, he mistakes Makio for Riko's boyfriend who is in fact Maki cross-dressing. There are hints in the manga that may show that he actually still has feelings for Riko.

 is a friend of Nagi. Yan was the vice-president of Minami Middle School's Student Council. He is constantly getting into conflict and misunderstandings with Maki.

 is a member of the Newspaper Club. While Nana is in charge for the photos, Momo handles in article writing.

 is another member of the Newspaper Club. She is clumsy and has a fear of heights, however, she is skilled with handling a camera; Suzu notes she takes good pictures.

Riko's mother.

 is Riko's younger brother. He is popular among girls. He also seems to have a crush on Maki.

 is Sayori's boyfriend. In their elementary days, he first viewed Sayori as somewhat weird yet resolvable. After an accident while cleaning the floors, Yū started to hold feelings for Sayori.

An elder looking school teacher at Fujisaki Academy. She often wears a long black dress with a white turtleneck blouse underneath.

Media

Manga

The series has been released in fifteen tankōbon volumes.

The fifteenth and final volume was released on January 7, 2020.

Anime

An anime television series adaptation aired in Japan on MBS from July 5 to September 27, 2013. The series was animated by Doga Kobo, produced by Aniplex and directed by Masahiko Ohta, with series composition by Takashi Aoshima, original character designs by Chiaki Nakajima and music by Yasuhiro Misawa. The series was streamed on Niconico, after premiering on July 14, 2013, and on Crunchyroll, starting with the 9th episode on August 30, 2013. Sentai Filmworks licensed the series for release in North America.

Reception
Carl Kimlinger of Anime News Network gave Love Lab an overall B− grade. He wrote that the series works better as a straightforward comedy when director Masahiko Ohta has the cast delivering slapstick humor than emotional moments throughout the three storylines that each carry a weighty dramatic ending like Kotoura-san, concluding that: "Even weighted down, though, this is a very funny comedy: easy to get into and easy to enjoy. It just isn't quite so easy to love."

See also
The Kawai Complex Guide to Manors and Hostel Behavior, another manga series by Ruri Miyahara.

References

External links
 Official anime website 
 

2006 manga
2013 anime television series debuts
Anime series based on manga
Animeism
Comedy anime and manga
Doga Kobo
Houbunsha manga
Seinen manga
Sentai Filmworks
Yonkoma